Leslie Wanford Sinton was an English professional footballer who played in the Football League for Gateshead as an outside right.

References 

English footballers
Brentford F.C. players
English Football League players
1915 births
Year of death missing
Association football outside forwards
Footballers from Newcastle upon Tyne
Gateshead A.F.C. players